Miss Grand China is a national title bestowed upon a woman chosen to represent China at the annual international pageant, Miss Grand International. The title was mentioned for the first time in 2013 when an actress from Shenyang, Jie Pan	(), was chosen to represent the country at the inaugural edition of Miss Grand International in Thailand.

Previously, the country representatives for the Miss Grand International pageant were determined through The Miss China contest, which was conducted by Guangzhou Zhoumeng Marketing, Co., Ltd., to which MGI PLC, the owner of Miss Grand International, awarded the franchise in 2013. However, the right was later transferred to a Zhanjiang-based event organizer, Xin Fu Lai Enterprise Management Co., Ltd., in 2020.

Since the first participation in 2013, China's representatives have never won the Miss Grand International title. The highest placement is the top 20 finalists in 2013 and 2017, obtained by Jie Pan and Chen Xuejiao, respectively.

History
China made its Miss Grand International debut in 2013. Its first representative, Jie Pan, was appointed by the Guangzhou-based event organizer led by Adam Lee, Guangzhou Zhoumeng Marketing Co., Ltd., which served as the national licensee of Miss Grand China from 2013 to 2020. The company also launched its own national pageant in 2013 named The Miss China to select the country representatives for various international pageants including Miss Grand International.

In the first years of establishment, the winners of the aforementioned national pageant were also assumed as Miss Grand China. However, after an international pageant called Miss Landscape International was launched by Adam Lee in 2018, the winners of The Miss China were instead sent to participate in his own established international pageant, and one of the runners-up was later appointed as Miss Grand China, causing the license to be transferred to another firm, Xin Fu Lai Enterprise Management, in 2020.

In 2021, an attempt to organize the inaugural edition of the Miss Grand China pageant was observed; the press conference of such was held in Zhanjiang on March 13, 2021, and the grand final competition was scheduled for October 4, also in Zhanjiang, but the plan was entirely canceled due to the impact of China government travel restrictions during the COIVD-19 pandemic in 2021–2022, which caused the licensee to instead appoint Chinese Canadians who previously participated in the Miss Universe China and Miss World Canada pageants to join the international pageant as China representatives.

Titleholders
The following is a list of Argentina representatives at the Miss Grand International contest.

References

External links

 

China